Nisterime, also known as 2α-chloro-4,5α-dihydrotestosterone 3-O-(p-nitrophenyl)oxime or as 2α-chloro-5α-androstan-17β-ol-3-one 3-O-(p-nitrophenyl)oxime, is a synthetic anabolic-androgenic steroid (AAS) and a derivative of dihydrotestosterone (DHT) that was never marketed. The C17α acetate ester of nisterime, nisterime acetate (ORF-9326), also exists and was developed as a postcoital contraceptive but was similarly never marketed.

See also
 Istaroxime

References

Abandoned drugs
Secondary alcohols
Androgens and anabolic steroids
Androstanes
Hormonal contraception
Nitrobenzenes
Organochlorides
Steroid oximes
Ketoximes